Rat Silo is a Canadian Alternative rock group based in Vancouver, British Columbia, Canada founded by James Newton, the former lead vocalist and guitarist of Canadian alternative rock band Sons of Freedom.

History
Originally formed in November 2007, Jim Newton organized the recording of the band's first album 'November 2007:What the Butler Saw' at North Vancouver's Crew Studios (formally Baker Street Studios) over a three-day session. Newton recruited Vancouver musicians Don Binns on bass (Sons of Freedom, Trailerhawk, Econoline Crush, Art Bergmann), Sean Stubbs on drums (Numb, SNFU, Jakalope, Bif Naked), Finn Manniche (Jazzmanian Devils, Van Django) on guitar, and Dave "Oz" Osbourne (54-40) on keyboards. Mark Henning produced and engineered the sessions.

In April 2009, Rat Silo's second album, 'Doubleplusungood' was released, It was recorded by Robert Handel and mixed by Mark Henning.

In October 2011, their third album, 'The Great Northern Way', was released. The album was recorded and mixed by Dave "Rave" Ogilvie at Vancouver's Mushroom Studios.

In 2017, after a two-year hiatus, Newton, Binns and Stubbs reformed and began working on new material. A fourth member, Erkan Gencol was added to the new line-up providing samples, loops, noises to augment the band's predominantly "guitar-driven" sound. In November 2019, the single, 'I Sacrifice: A veteran's lament' was released. It was recorded and mixed by producer/engineer Mike Foster at Vancouver's Blackfish Sound Studio.

In May 2020, their fourth album 'The World Is Going To End Tomorrow' was released. It was recorded and mixed earlier that year by Dave "Rave" Ogilvie and Anthony "Fu" Valcic at Vancouver's Hipposonic Studios.

In May 2022, the single, 'The World Is Going to End Tomorrow' was released. It was one of a group of songs recorded and mixed earlier that year by Dave "Rave" Ogilvie and Anthony "Fu" Valcic at Vancouver's Hipposonic Studios. The song's release was accompanied with a live-performance video recorded at the "Rat’s Nest rehearsal space" by Vancouver photographer, author, and filmmaker Adam P.W. Smith. 

Rat Silo's fifth album entitled 'Unfortunately...' was released on November 21st 2022. The seven-song album contained two previously released singles "The World Is Going To End Tomorrow" and "Head on a Stick", along with five new tracks. All the album's songs were recorded at Vancouver's Hipposonic Studios by Dave "Rave" Ogilvie and Liam Moes and then mixed by Anthony "Fu" Valcic at his home studio in Halfmoon Bay, BC.

Discography

Studio albums
November 2007: What The Butler Saw (2007)
March 2009: Doubleplusungood (2009)
The Great Northern Way (2011)
The World Is Going to End Tomorrow (2020)
Unfortunately... (2022)

Singles
I Sacrifice (2019)
The World Is Going to End Tomorrow (2022)
Head on a Stick (2022)

References

External links
Rat Silo Official website

Canadian alternative rock groups
Musical groups from Vancouver
Musical groups established in 2007